Tomato frogs are any of the three species of genus Dyscophus (family Microhylidae): D. antongilii, D. insularis, or D. guineti. Dyscophus is the only genus in subfamily Dyscophinae. They are endemic to Madagascar.

The common name comes from D. antongilii's bright red color. When threatened, a tomato frog puffs up its body. When a predator grabs a tomato frog in its mouth, the frog's skin secretes a thick substance that numbs up the predator's eyes and mouth, causing the predator to release the frog to free up its eyes. The gummy substance contains a toxin that occasionally causes allergic reactions in humans. The allergic reaction will not kill a human and the frog secretes it only when frightened.

The lifespan of the tomato frog can be from 6 to 8 years.
When adult, the colors may vary from yellowish orange to deep red. Tomato frogs will reach sexual maturity in 9–14 months. Females are larger than males and can reach 4 inches in length. Males can reach 2 to 3 inches in length. Most females range from reddish-orange to bright dark red. The bellies are usually more yellowish, and sometimes there are black spots on the throat. But males are not as brightly colored but more of a duller orange or brownish-orange. Juveniles are also dull in color and develop brighter coloration as they mature. According to the Smithsonian National Zoo tomato frog's conservation status has been updated to that of least concern. They breed in the rainy season and are nocturnal. They tend to eat small insects and invertebrates.

Species
There are three different species:

Reproductive activity
Tomato frogs lay fresh eggs during every month of the year except for November. Their reproductive activity is high during the months January–May and low between the months June–December.

References

External links
 Species information 
 D. antongilli 
 Web links for D. insularis 
 D. guineti

Microhylidae
 
Taxa named by Alfred Grandidier